In the mathematical description of general relativity, the Boyer–Lindquist coordinates are a generalization of the coordinates used for the metric of a Schwarzschild black hole that can be used to express the metric of a Kerr black hole.

The Hamiltonian for test particle motion in Kerr spacetime is separable in Boyer–Lindquist coordinates. Using Hamilton–Jacobi theory one can derive a fourth constant of the motion known as Carter's constant.

The 1967 paper introducing Boyer–Lindquist coordinates was a posthumous publication for Robert H. Boyer, who was killed in the 1966 University of Texas tower shooting.

Line element
The line element for a black hole with a total mass equivalent , angular momentum , and charge  in Boyer–Lindquist coordinates and natural units is

where
 called the discriminant, 

and
 called the Kerr parameter.
This line element describes the Kerr–Newman metric. Here,  is to be interpreted as the mass of the black hole, as seen by an observer at infinity,  is interpreted as the angular momentum, and  the electric charge. These are all meant to be constant parameters, held fixed. The name of the discriminant arises because it appears as the discriminant of the quadratic equation bounding time-like motion of particles orbiting the black hole, i.e. defining the ergosphere.

Vierbein
The vierbein one-forms can be read off directly from the line element:

so that the line element is give by

where  is the flat-space Minkowski metric.

Spin connection
The torsion-free spin connection  is defined by

The contorsion tensor gives the difference between a connection with torsion, and a corresponding connection without torsion. By convention, Riemann manifolds are always specified with torsion-free geometries; torsion is often used to specify equivalent, flat geometries.

The spin connection is useful, because it provides an intermediate way-point for computing the curvature two-form:

It is also the most suitable form for describing the coupling to spinor fields, and opens the door to the twistor formalism.

All six components of the spin connection are non-vanishing. These are:

Riemann and Ricci tensors
The Riemann tensor written out in full is quite verbose; it can be found in Frè. The Ricci tensor takes the diagonal form:

Notice the location of the minus-one entry: this comes entirely from the electromagnetic contribution.

Equating this with the energy–momentum tensor for the gravitational field leads to the Kerr–Newman electrovacuum solution.

References 

 

Black holes
Coordinate charts in general relativity